Andrés Pavón Murillo (born 21 July 1962) is a Honduran politician and Human Rights activist. He ran unsuccessfully as a presidential candidate for the 2013 general election representing the UD/FAPER alliance. and former President of the Committee for the Defense of Human Rights in Honduras.

References

1962 births
Living people
People from Colón Department (Honduras)
Candidates for President of Honduras
Honduran activists